20th Central Committee may refer to:
Central Committee of the 20th Congress of the Communist Party of the Soviet Union, 1956–1961
20th Central Committee of the Chinese Communist Party, 2022–2027